Providence St. Vincent Medical Center, is a non-profit, acute care teaching hospital in an unincorporated section of Washington County, Oregon, in the West Haven-Sylvan area north of Beaverton, Oregon and west of Portland, Oregon, United States – and within the Portland metropolitan area. The hospital was founded in 1875 by the Sisters of Providence, a Roman Catholic sisterhood from Montreal, Quebec, Canada. It is Providence Health & Services’s largest Oregon hospital.

History

Dedicated on July 19, 1875, St. Vincent Hospital was the state's first permanent hospital, founded in the Northwest district of Portland, Oregon, by the Sisters of Providence, a Roman Catholic sisterhood from Montreal, Quebec, Canada.

In January 1971, the original campus in northwest Portland was closed and the current facility opened in Washington County. On January 31, 1971, the hospital used in-part large military buses capable of carrying 18 stretchers at a time to transport patients to the new hospital building.  The facility at that time had a single, 13-story tower that consisted of seven floors of patient rooms. The new building had 400 hospital beds, while the old hospital had 420 beds.

Post-millennium
In 2004, the hospital was one of three in Oregon named by Solucient as a top 100 hospital in the United States.  In November 2009, the employees at the hospital, in conjunction with Medline Industries, produced the "Pink Glove Dance" video (set to "Down") to raise awareness of breast cancer, with the video going viral on the Internet and making national news.

In October 2015, work began on a four-year, $85 million remodeling of the nine-story main hospital building, which was built in 1971.  Along with seismic retrofitting and modest expansion, the project will add a new aluminum exterior over the building's existing exposed-concrete surface, greatly changing its appearance when completed.

Programs and institutes
St. Vincent has specialized programs including Providence Heart and Vascular Institute, Oregon Medical Laser Center, Providence Multiple Sclerosis Center, and Providence Stroke Center. The hospital is licensed for 523 beds, and has over 3,500 employees. There are approximately 1,647 medical staff. Providence St. Vincent Medical Center is also one of four nursing magnet hospitals in Portland, the others being Providence Portland Medical Center, Oregon Health & Science University Hospital, and the Portland Veterans Affairs Medical Center.

Notes

References

External links

Official website
Portland Business Journal

Hospitals established in 1875
Hospital buildings completed in 1971
Hospitals in Portland, Oregon
St. Vincent
Buildings and structures in Washington County, Oregon
1875 establishments in Oregon
West Haven-Sylvan, Oregon